The 2009–10 NLB Liga ABA was the 9th season of the Liga ABA. 14 teams from Serbia, Croatia, Slovenia, Bosnia and Herzegovina and Montenegro participated in the NLB League: Union Olimpija, Helios, Cibona, Zagreb, Zadar, Split, Bosna, Široki Eronet, Partizan, Crvena zvezda, FMP, Hemofarm, Radnički Kragujevac, Budućnost. The 2009-10 NLB League Final Four was held on April 23–25, 2010, in Arena Zagreb.

Team information

Venues and locations

Regular season

The regular season began on Saturday, October 10, 2009, and ended on Saturday, March 20, 2010.

Standings

Schedule and Results

Stats Leaders

Points

Rebounds

Assists

Ranking MVP

MVP Round by Round
{| class="wikitable sortable" style="text-align: center;"
|-
! align="center"|Round
! align="center"|Player
! align="center"|Team
! align="center"|Efficiency
|-
|1||align="left"| Marko Brkić||Radnički||29
|-
|2||align="left"| Jermaine Anderson||Cedevita||31
|-
|3||align="left"| Boban Marjanović ||Hemofarm||36
|-
|4||align="left"| Aleks Marić ||Partizan||36
|-
|5||align="left"| Marko Tomas||Cibona||43
|-
|6||align="left"| Andrija Žižić||Cedevita||40
|-
|7||align="left"| Filip Videnov||Crvena zvezda||43
|-
|8||align="left"| Chester Mason||Široki||39
|-
|9||align="left"| Ante Tomić||Zagreb||35
|-
|10||align="left"| Chester Mason ||Široki||34
|-
|11||align="left"| Marino Baždarić||Cedevita || 28
|-
|12||align="left"| Goran Jeretin||Budućnost || 34
|-
|13||align="left"| Miroslav Raduljica||FMP || 36
|-
|14||align="left"| Nemanja Protić||FMP || 37
|-
|15||align="left"| Slavko Vraneš||Partizan || 31
|-
|16||align="left"| Jamont Gordon||Cibona || 34
|-
|17||align="left"| Damir Mulaomerović||Zagreb || 41
|-
|18||align="left"| Matt Walsh||Olimpija || 28
|-
|19||align="left"| Lukša Andrić||Cibona || 31
|-
|20||align="left"| Ivan Grgat||Široki || 41
|-
|21||align="left"| Jermaine Anderson ||Cedevita || 31
|-
|22||align="left"| Jamont Gordon ||Cibona || 33
|-
|23||align="left"| Nemanja Bjelica||Crvena zvezda || 44
|-
|24||align="left"| Chester Mason ||Široki || 57
|-
|25||align="left"| Milan Mačvan||Hemofarm || 32
|-
|26||align="left"| Miroslav Raduljica ||FMP || 33
|-
|27||align="left"| Jamont Gordon ||Cibona || 31
|-
|28||align="left"| Jamont Gordon ||Cibona || 31
|-

Final four
Matches played in, Arena Zagreb, Zagreb, Croatia

Semifinals

Partizan vs. Hemofarm STADA

Cibona vs. Union Olimpija

Final

References

External links
 adriaticbasket.info

2009–10
2009–10 in European basketball leagues
2009–10 in Serbian basketball
2009–10 in Slovenian basketball
2009–10 in Croatian basketball
2009–10 in Bosnia and Herzegovina basketball
2009–10 in Montenegrin basketball